Kristina Richter ( Hochmuth, born 24 October 1946) is a former East German handball player who competed in the 1976 Summer Olympics and in the 1980 Summer Olympics.

In 1976 she won a silver medal with the East German team. She played all five matches and scored 27 goals.

Four years later she won a bronze medal as a member of the East German team. She played all five matches and scored 19 goals.

She was inducted into Germany's Sports Hall of Fame in July 2016.

References

External links
profile

1946 births
Living people
German female handball players
Handball players at the 1976 Summer Olympics
Handball players at the 1980 Summer Olympics
Olympic handball players of East Germany
Olympic silver medalists for East Germany
Olympic bronze medalists for East Germany
Olympic medalists in handball
Medalists at the 1980 Summer Olympics
Medalists at the 1976 Summer Olympics